The 2011 Rallye Deutschland was the ninth round of the 2011 World Rally Championship season. The rally took place over 19–21 August, and was based in Trier, in the Rhineland-Palatinate state of Germany. The rally was also the sixth round of the Super 2000 World Rally Championship, and the fourth round of the WRC Academy.

Sébastien Ogier won his first tarmac rally, and became the first driver other than his team-mate Sébastien Loeb to win the rally since it became a world championship event in 2002. Ogier benefitted from a puncture suffered by Loeb on the last stage of Saturday's running, and eventually won by just under 40 seconds from Loeb. This also resulted in some controversial remarks by Sébastien Ogier claiming there is "justice in the sport" referencing his prior displeasure with his team's decision to have Ogier hold off while teammate Sébastien Loeb held the lead. Meanwhile, Dani Sordo finished third, taking the first podium for the Mini WRC Team since its return to the sport.

In the SWRC, Ott Tänak took a comfortable victory by over five minutes, while in the WRC Academy, Egon Kaur's perfect start to the season was ended, after he finished in eighth place. Craig Breen, who finished second to Kaur in the previous round in Finland, took his first victory in the class.

Results

Event standings

† – The WRC Academy featured the first two days of the rally.

Special stages

Power Stage
The "Power stage" was a live, televised  stage at the end of the rally, held in Trier.

References

External links 

 Results at eWRC.com

Deutschland
Rallye Deutschland
Rallye Deutschland